Décompte is the MusiquePlus Top 20 Countdown. Starting 21 August 2012, the name was changed to Décompte MusiquePlus. It is a ninety-minute music video program block, that airs on French Canadian music television station MusiquePlus.

Number ones
Here is a listing of number ones from January 2011 onwards:

2011

2012

Renamed Décompte MusiquePlus

External links
Décompte MusiquePlus page

2000s Canadian music television series
Music chart television shows
2010s Canadian music television series